Sudhir Asnani (born 7 December 1960 in Bhopal, Madhya Pradesh) is an international cricket umpire from India. He has umpired ten One Day Internationals, four Twenty20 International match and 23 Indian Premier League matches.

See also
 List of One Day International cricket umpires
 List of Twenty20 International cricket umpires

References

External links
Sudhir Asnani at ESPNcricinfo
Sudhir Asnani at CricketArchive

1960 births
Living people
Indian One Day International cricket umpires
Indian Twenty20 International cricket umpires